Hassan Abdel-Fattah Mahmoud Al-Mahsiri is a Jordanian former footballer who played as an attacking midfielder.

International goals
Scores and results list Jordan's goal tally first.

Participation in International Tournaments

In AFC Asian Cups 
2004 Asian Cup
2011 Asian Cup

In WAFF Championships 
2004 WAFF Championship
2007 WAFF Championship
2008 WAFF Championship
2010 WAFF Championship

References

Citations
 
 Hassan Abdel-Fattah Transfers to Al-Karamah (SYR)
 Abdel-Fattah: The Two Goals Confounded our Calculations
 Jordanian Abdel-Fattah Officially Out on Loan to Kuwait SC
 Abdel-Fattah: "Brazil 2014 is our Goal!"
 Jordanian Abdel-Fattah Joins Al-Khor SC of Qatar
 Qatar's Al-Khor SC Officially Signs up for Hassan Abdel-Fattah's Return
 Interview With Abdel-Fattah

External links 
 
 
 
 
 Profile at the Jordan Football Association 

1982 births
Living people
Jordanian footballers
Jordan international footballers
Jordanian expatriate footballers
Association football midfielders
Expatriate footballers in Syria
Expatriate footballers in Kuwait
Jordanian people of Palestinian descent
2004 AFC Asian Cup players
2011 AFC Asian Cup players
Al-Wehdat SC players
Hatta Club players
Expatriate footballers in Qatar
Expatriate footballers in the United Arab Emirates
Qatar Stars League players
Al-Khor SC players
Al Kharaitiyat SC players
Al-Shamal SC players
Al-Karamah players
UAE First Division League players
Qatari Second Division players
Syrian Premier League players
Category:Jordanian Pro League players
Kuwait SC players
Kuwait Premier League players
Jordanian expatriate sportspeople in Kuwait
Jordanian expatriate sportspeople in Qatar
Jordanian expatriate sportspeople in the United Arab Emirates
Jordanian expatriate sportspeople in Syria